The 2020–21 season was Futebol Clube do Porto's 111th competitive season and 87th consecutive season in the top flight of Portuguese football. In addition to the domestic league, Porto participated in this season's editions of the Taça de Portugal, the Taça da Liga and the UEFA Champions League. The season started on 19 September 2020 and concluded on 19 May 2021.

On 23 December 2020, Porto defeated Benfica 2–0 to win the 42nd edition of the Supertaça Cândido de Oliveira, securing their first title of the season and a record-extending 22nd win in the competition.

Players

Squad information

Transfers

In

Out

Loan in

Loan return

Loan out

Technical staff

{| class=wikitable
|-
!Position
!Staff
|-
| Head coach ||  Sérgio Conceição
|-
|rowspan=2| Assistant coaches ||  Vítor Bruno
|-
| Siramana Dembélé
|-
| Goalkeeper coach ||  Diamantino Figueiredo
|-
| Exercise Physiologist  ||  Eduardo Oliveira
|-

Pre-season and friendlies
The club's pre-season was shorter due to the late finish of the previous season (1 August 2020) caused by the COVID-19 pandemic. Porto played six matches at home against other Portuguese teams and, unlike previous seasons, there was no official presentation match.

Competitions

Overview

Primeira Liga

League table

Results summary

Results by round

Matches
The league fixtures were announced on 28 August 2020.

Taça de Portugal

Taça da Liga

Supertaça Cândido de Oliveira

UEFA Champions League

Group stage

The group stage draw was held on 1 October 2020.

Knockout phase

Round of 16
The draw for the round of 16 was held on 14 December 2020.

Quarter-finals
The draw for the quarter-finals was held on 19 March 2021.

Statistics

Appearances and discipline
Numbers in parentheses denote appearances as substitute.

Goalscorers

Clean sheets

Notes

References

External links

FC Porto seasons
Porto
FC Porto